F4 Brazilian Championship is a racing series regulated according to FIA Formula 4 regulations. Originally, the agreement was signed between CBA (Confederação Brasileira de Automobilismo) and F / Promo Racing, the company that already organized Formula Vee competitions in Brazil. The latter was replaced by Vicar, the organizator of Stock Car Brasil, before the inaugural season in 2022.

History
Gerhard Berger and the FIA Singleseater Commission launched Formula 4 in March 2013. The goal of the Formula 4 was to make the ladder to Formula 1 more transparent. Besides sporting and technical regulations, costs are also regulated. A car to compete in this category may not exceed €30,000 and a single season in Formula 4 may not exceed €100,000.

Car
Italian race car constructor Tatuus F4-T014 was planned to be chosen as the official series car. Due to delay of the inauguration, the series used newer F4-T-421 model.

Champions

Drivers

Teams

Circuits 

 Bold denotes a circuit will be used in the 2023 season.

Notes

References

External links
 

Formula racing series
Recurring sporting events established in 2014
Formula 4 series